Oslerus is a genus of nematodes belonging to the family Filaroididae.

The species of this genus are found Eastern Asia.

Species:

Oslerus osleri
Oslerus rostratus

References

Nematodes